Frank Hoffmeister, born 9 October 1965, is a former backstroke swimmer from West Germany.

Frank competed in the 100 metre backstroke at the 1988 Summer Olympics in Seoul, South Korea, finishing seventh in the Championship Final in a time of 56.19 seconds.

He swam the opening backstroke leg for the West German team that finished fourth in the 4×100 metre medley relay in a time of 3 minutes 42.98 seconds.

References

German male swimmers
Olympic swimmers of West Germany
Swimmers at the 1988 Summer Olympics
Living people
World Aquatics Championships medalists in swimming
European Aquatics Championships medalists in swimming
Year of birth missing (living people)
20th-century German people
21st-century German people